Marino Benejam Ferrer (Ciutadella, Menorca January 26, 1890 - Barcelona, January 19, 1975) was a Spanish cartoonist.

Biography
In 1897, when Benejam was seven years old, his family moved to Barcelona, where he would always live. There he studied drawing at an academy.

He started drawing comics before the Spanish Civil War, for magazines like Pocholo and TBO, where he created in 1936 the character Melitón Pérez. Since 1941, he concentrated all his graphic activity on TBO, making thousands of comics and illustrating series such as La familia Ulises (about the daily life comedic misadventures of a middle-class family) (1944), with a script by Joaquín Buigas. He also drew since 1946 Eustaquio Morcillón y Babalí a comedic series about a hunter and his black servant in an Africa drawn in a minimalist way.

References

External links 
Comic creator: Benejam in Lambiek Comiclopedia

1890 births
1975 deaths
Spanish comics artists
Spanish comics writers
19th-century Spanish artists
People from Menorca
Spanish cartoonists